Cocke's Mill House and Mill Site, also known as Coles' Mill and Johnston's Mill, is a historic home located near North Garden, Albemarle County, Virginia. The miller's house was built in about 1820, and is a 1 1/2-half-story, three-bay, gable-roofed stone cottage built on a high basement.  A one-story frame addition was built in 1989.  Located on the property are the stone foundations of Cocke's Mill, built about 1792.  It was originally two stories high with dimensions of 51 feet by 40 feet, and the stone walls of the original mill and tail race. The mill remained in use into the 1930s, and burned sometime in the 1940s.

It was added to the National Register of Historic Places in 1990.

References

Houses on the National Register of Historic Places in Virginia
Houses completed in 1820
Houses in Albemarle County, Virginia
National Register of Historic Places in Albemarle County, Virginia
1820 establishments in Virginia